Hestenes is a surname. Notable people with the surname include:

Arne Hestenes (1920–1995), Norwegian journalist
David Hestenes (born 1933), American theoretical physicist and science educator
Magnus Hestenes (1906–1991), American mathematician
Ola M. Hestenes (1919–2008), Norwegian politician
Olav Hestenes (1930–1996), Norwegian barrister

Norwegian-language surnames